Ride the Wind (1982) by Lucia St. Clair Robson is the story of Cynthia Ann Parker's life after she was captured during the Comanche raid on her family's fort.  In 1836, when she was nine years old, Cynthia was kidnapped by Comanche Indians. This is the story of how she grew up with them, mastered their ways, married one of their leaders, and became, in every way, a Comanche woman. Her son Quanah Parker was the last Comanche leader to surrender.  It is also an account of a people who were happiest when they were moving, and a depiction of a way of life that is gone forever.

Ride the Wind earned The Western Writers' Golden Spur Award for best historical western in 1982.  It also made the NY Times and Washington Post best seller lists that year.  In its 26th printing, it is still popular today.  Ride the Wind has earned more than 120 5-star reviews on Amazon.

Ride the Wind was voted one of 100 Western Classics for the century by; 100 Years of Western Classics as selected by American Western Magazine's readers in 2000 100 Western Classics

External links
Ride the Wind at Lucia St. Clair Robson's website

1982 American novels
American historical novels
Western (genre) novels
Novels by Lucia St. Clair Robson
Biographical novels
Southwestern United States in fiction
Books about Native Americans
Ballantine Books books